Ancylolomia endophaealis is a moth in the family Crambidae. It was described by George Hampson in 1910. It is found in the Democratic Republic of the Congo.

References

Ancylolomia
Moths described in 1910
Moths of Africa